Judgment in Berlin is a 1988 American drama film directed and written by Leo Penn, produced by Joshua Sinclair, who also co-wrote the film and acted in it, and Ingrid Windisch and starring Martin Sheen, Sam Wanamaker and Sean Penn, the director's son. It is based on the book Judgment in Berlin by Herbert J. Stern.

It was shot at the Tempelhof Studios in Berlin and on location around the city.

Synopsis 
Based on the Cold War true story of three East Berlin men who hijack a plane to escape to the West. After being caught, they stand trial in Germany, where an American judge must decide if the hijacking of a plane into West Berlin was justified by the political circumstances and economic hardships of life in the German Democratic Republic.

Cast
Listed in credits order:

 Martin Sheen as Herbert J Stern: US federal judge
 Sam Wanamaker as Bernard Hellring: defence attorney
 Max Gail as Judah Best: defence attorney
 Jürgen Heinrich as Uri Andreyev: Soviet official
 Heinz Hoenig as Helmut Thiele: hijacker
 Carl Lumbly as Edwin Palmer: US State Dept prosecutor
 Max Volkert Martens as Hans Schuster: electrical engineer
 Cristine Rose as Marsha Stern: wife of Herbert
 Marie-Louise Sinclair as Kim Becker: West German legal counsel
 Joshua Sinclair as Alan Sherman: US State Dept prosecutor
 Jutta Speidel as Sigrid Radke: waitress
 Harris Yulin as Bruno Ristau: US Dept. of Justice official
 Sean Penn as Guenther X: refugee
 Burt Nelson as Patrick J. Heller: Colonel USAF
 Malgorzata Gebel as Beata Levandovska: flight attendant (as Malgoscha Gebel)
 Ed Bishop as Dyson Wilde: US State Dept. official

External links 
 
 

1988 films
1988 drama films
American drama films
West German films
English-language German films
Films set in Berlin
Films directed by Leo Penn
Films shot in Berlin
Films shot at Tempelhof Studios
Films set in East Germany
Films set in West Germany
1980s English-language films
1980s American films